İmamuşağı  is a village in Silifke district of Mersin Province, Turkey. The population of İmamuşağı   is 644 as of 2011. Main economic activities of the village are farming and animal breeding. Olive and locust are the main crops. İmamuşağı is a mountain village . But it is a dispersed settlement and one of its neighbourhoods named Boğsak is at the sea side. A hamlet, it is a popular seaside resort for Mersin residents. There are also beaches and historical castles around Boğsak.

See also
Boğsak Islet

References

External links
 Boğsak Bay

Villages in Silifke District